Idrija lace is a bobbin tape lace. The tape is made with bobbins at the same time as the rest of the lace, curving back on itself, and joined using a crochet hook.

References

Bobbin lace